Below is a list of U.S. state birds as designated by each state's, district's or territory's government.

The selection of state birds began with Kentucky adopting the northern cardinal in 1926. It continued when the legislatures for Alabama, Florida, Maine, Missouri, Oregon, Texas and Wyoming selected their state birds after a campaign was started by the General Federation of Women's Clubs to name official state birds in the 1920s. The last state to choose its bird was Arizona in 1973.

Pennsylvania never chose an official state bird, but did choose the ruffed grouse as the state game bird. Alaska, California, and South Dakota permit hunting of their state birds. Alabama, Georgia, Massachusetts, Missouri, Oklahoma, South Carolina, and Tennessee have designated an additional "state game bird" for the purpose of hunting. The northern cardinal is the state bird of seven states, followed by the western meadowlark as the state bird of six states.

The District of Columbia designated a district bird in 1938. Of the five inhabited territories of the United States,  American Samoa and Puerto Rico are the only ones without territorial birds.

State birds

Notes

Other state birds 
In addition to having a state bird, some states have chosen a state game bird (or state wild game bird), a state waterfowl (or state duck), a state raptor, or a bird as their state symbol of peace.

States with the same state bird 
Some state birds are shared between multiple states. Of the 50 states, a total of 32 do not have a unique state bird.

Notes

References

External links

Birds
Birds in culture